Josephine Riley is a British writer, translator, theatre actor, and schoolteacher. Dr. Riley has written and translated several books about theatre arts, especially Chinese theatre. She currently teaches film and drama at Munich International School in Germany.

Riley reads, writes, and speaks Mandarin Chinese, and is better known for having in the early 1980s widely traveled in China and learned to act in the Chinese theatre as one of the first foreign students at the Central Academy of Drama in Beijing, eventually writing Chinese Theatre and the Actor in Performance (1997, Cambridge University Press), a reference book that "gives an 'inside' view of Chinese theatre and the actor in performance for the first time [...] from her personal observations of, and dialogue with, Chinese actors and her first-hand experiences of the theatre world of China in general, none of which was possible before 1980." She also made the first English translation of The Other Shore by Nobel Laureate in Literature playwright Gao Xingjian.

Biography

Life

Jo Riley graduated from the University of Cambridge. After working for a number of small touring companies, she went to Asia to explore a different kind of theatre. In the early 1980s, after learning Mandarin Chinese, she was one of the first foreign students at the Central Academy of Drama in Beijing, where she learned to act in the Chinese theatre (example pictured at right).

She has since then helped teach and direct traditional Chinese theatre in Salzburg, Mainz, and Bayreuth. She's also been at intercultural workshops with Cardiff Laboratory Theatre and Pan Projects at Goldsmiths College, London. In addition, she has written articles and books on Chinese theatre, especially Chinese Theatre and the Actor in Performance (1997, see Works section), and has edited or translated several plays or books on European and intercultural theatre.

She currently teaches film at Munich International School in Germany.

Works

In 1997, Cambridge University Press published Riley's Chinese Theatre and the Actor in Performance, a book often cited on the topic of Chinese theatre.  It covers not only jingju (Beijing opera or Peking opera, example pictured at right) but also Chinese puppet theatre and shadow play, as well as Chinese exorcism and ancient animation rites at the tomb, to explore how the Chinese create presence on a stage. In a 1999 review for the Asian Theatre Journal, China specialist Prof. Colin Mackerras (author of The Cambridge Handbook of Contemporary China, brother of Malcolm Mackerras) noted how the book "looks at the skills of the Chinese actor from the insider's point of view – not that of the Westerner or the student of China." Indeed:

Riley also made, under the title The Other Side (1997), the first English translation of the controversial play The Other Shore (1986) by Nobel Laureate in Literature playwright Gao Xingjian.

Bibliography

As editor
Edited or co-edited publications include:
 1990: The Dramatic Touch of Difference: Theatre, Own and Foreign, by various
 Collected essays edited by Erika Fischer-Lichte(in German), Jo Riley, & Michael Gissenwehrer, Forum Modernes Theater, vol. 2, Tübingen: Gunter Narr Verlag, 1990, GBOOK BoB6jbZqbhgC; 287 p., illustrations, paperback – Co-credit was to "Josephine Riley".
 1997: The Show and the Gaze of Theatre: A European Perspective, by Erika Fischer-Lichte(in German)
 Collected essays (1986–1995) edited (and some translated from the German into English) by Jo Riley, Studies in Theatre History and Culture, Iowa City: University of Iowa Press, November 1997, GBOOK HF3wu1vVm2gC; 426 (x, 412) p., illustrations, paperback. (Hardback: February 1998)

As author
Publications include:
 1997: Chinese Theatre and the Actor in Performance
 Cambridge studies in modern theatre, Cambridge, UK: Cambridge University Press, June 1997, GBOOK OIAiYaIfFagC; 360 (xii, 348) p., illustrations, hardback. (Paperback: December 2006, .)

As translator
Translations include:
 1997: The Other Side: A Contemporary Drama Without Acts, by Gao Xingjian
 Translated from the Chinese Bi An (1986) into English by Jo Riley, in Martha P. Y. Cheung & Jane C. C. Lai (eds.), An Oxford Anthology of Contemporary Chinese Drama, p. 149–184, Hong Kong & New York: Oxford University Press, September 1997, GBOOK XUFkAAAAMAAJ; 900 (xxvi, 873) p., hardback – Part of an anthology of 15 plays. This play was later retranslated by someone else as The Other Shore for a different collection of plays.
 2001: History of European Drama and Theatre, by Erika Fischer-Lichte(in German)
 Translated from the German Geschichte des Dramas (1990) into English by Jo Riley, London, UK & New York: Routledge, December 2001, GBOOK 5JWfX8mjX8AC; 432 (x, 396) p., hardback. (Paperback: May 2004, .)

References

Notes

Sources
Main sources used for this article:
 ISTA (2008). "Teacher Information Pack for the London 1 TAPS" (Theatre Arts Programmes Symposium) (Word document), International Schools Theatre Association (ISTA), 2008 – Contains a self-bio.
 Mackerras, Colin (1999). "Chinese Theatre and the Actor in Performance. By Jo Riley" (book review), Asian Theatre Journal, University of Hawaii Press, vol. 16, no. 1 (Spring 1999), p. 127–129

                   

Year of birth missing (living people)
Living people
British stage actresses
British theatre critics
20th-century British women writers
Chinese–English translators
German–English translators
British book editors
British women editors
British schoolteachers
Drama teachers
Alumni of the University of Cambridge
Central Academy of Drama alumni
Women theatre critics
20th-century British translators